Nanjing Library is the third largest library in China with over 10 million items. It houses important scientific, cultural and arts literature relating to Jiangsu province and other national historical records such as ancient Chinese and foreign publications. As located in the ancient capital Nanjing, the library contains 1.6 million ancient books and 100,000 volumes of books, documents and manuscripts (including Buddhist scriptures) dating from the Tang dynasty to the Ming dynasty.

History 

Nanjing Library was established in 1907 as Jiangnan Library. Over time, the library has undergone several organisational changes. The library endured through Qing dynasty, Republic of China, and the People's Republic of China. It witnessed greatest changes that took place in modern China and by itself gives clear records to the one-century history of modern China.
Resources of books: Most of books were collected in 1949 (The year of establishment of People's Republic of China), including both printed and written document literature.  Currently, the number of collection books in Nanjing Library is 2.3 million.  One feature of Nanjing Library is ancient documents which is 1.6 million.

Jiangnan Library 
In 1907 Duan Fang, Viceroy of Liangjiang, established Jiangnan Library on the site of Xiyin Academy at Nanjing in order to preserve ancient books and scrolls of Song dynasty, Yuan dynasty, Ming dynasty, and Qing dynasty. Miao Quansun was appointed to be the librarian.  The Jiangnan Library was the first modern public library in China.

China Studies Library
Jiangnan Library  was renamed China Studies Library (or Library of Chinese Studies, 國學圖書館) during the Nationalist Government.

In 1927, the University District System was adopted in Jiangsu Province, and according to the system, Jiangnan Library was to be administered by the national university with the additional function of administering educational affairs in Jiangsu, in that year, and then in the May 1928 it was renamed as Library of Chinese Studies, National Central University, the name of which university was successively changed from National Southeastern University to Nanjing Zhongshan University in 1927, Jiangsu University and then Central University in 1928 and finally Nanjing University in 1949. Liu Yizheng was appointed to be the chief librarian. In October 1929, the University District System was abolished, and the library was administered by the Jiangsu Department of Education  and was renamed as Jiangsu Provincial Library of Chinese Studies.

National Central Library 
In 1933, the Chinese Ministry of Education built the National Central Library on Chengxian Street in Nanjing. The library was relocated several times due to the Sino-Japanese War and the Chinese Civil War. Jiang Fucong was the chief librarian. Towards the end of 1948, Jiang Fucong took about 130,000 volumes of rare books to Taiwan under instructions of the Republic of China. The core of this collection was formed by the "Rare Book Preservation Society" in 1940–41. In May 1949, the library was handed over to the Nanjing Military Control Commission. During the civil war National Central Library moved to Taipei and the remained in Nanjing was later renamed Nanjing Library.

Nanjing Library 
On March 19, 1950, National Central Library was renamed as National Nanjing Library by the Ministry of Culture, and was put under the joint administration of the Bureau of Cultural Relics and Ministry of Culture. He Changqun was appointed as chief librarian. In October 1952, National Nanjing Library merged with Jiangsu Provincial Library of Chinese Studies. In July 1954 the library renamed Nanjing Library and was supervised by the Jiangsu Provincial Department of Culture. Wang Changbing was appointed as chief librarian.

Departmental structure
The Nanjing Library is organized in the following structure.

Office of the Chinese Communist Party Committee of NL
Chief Librarian's Office
Hu Resources Department
Labor Union
Office of General Affairs
Security Office
Department of Acquisition and Cataloging
Reader Service Department
Department of Information Resources Development
Department of Information Technology Application
Historical Archive Department
Research and Training Department
Editing House of 21st Century Library

Reciprocal library exchange program
Nanjing Library has partnered with the State Library of Victoria (Australia) for reciprocal exchange since 1985. This includes staff visits and exchange of publications between the libraries.

Location
The Nanjing Library is located at
Main Library
66 Chengxian Road,
Nanjing, Jiangsu Province 210018,
People's Republic of China

Transportation
The library is accessible from Daxinggong Station of Nanjing Metro.

See also
National Central Library
Jinling Library
Shanghai Library
Libraries in the People's Republic of China
 National Library of China
Chinese Library Classification (CLC)
Archives in the People's Republic of China

References

External links

Nanjing Library (English version)

Libraries in Nanjing
1907 establishments in China
Libraries established in 1907